George Wallington Grabham (1 September 1836–23 July 1912) was a New Zealand doctor and health administrator.

Life
Grabham was born in Rochford, Essex, England on 1 September 1836. He was one of at least eleven children born to Sarah (born Fry) and John Grabham. He had at least four sisters including the education reformer Elizabeth Surr. He and three of his brothers went into medicine including Michael Comport Grabham who worked on Madeira.

He was trained and worked in the UK until in 1882 he became the NZ inspector of hospitals and inspector of lunatic asylums. He was the author of the Hospitals and Charitable Institutions Act 1885.

References

1836 births
1912 deaths
People from Rochford
English emigrants to New Zealand
New Zealand hospital administrators